The National Basketball League Most Valuable Player (MVP) is an annual National Basketball League (NBL) award given since the 2003 New Zealand NBL season to the best performing player of the regular season. At the end of each season, the player with the most votes is awarded the Most Valuable Player for that season. Prior to the 2003 season, imports were deemed ineligible for receiving MVP honours, with the league instead awarding a Kiwi MVP each season as a way of recognising the best performing New Zealander.

Winners

See also
 List of National Basketball League (New Zealand) awards

References

Awards established in 2003
Basketball most valuable player awards
Most Valuable